Trichomonas vaginalis is an anaerobic, flagellated protozoan parasite and the causative agent of a sexually transmitted disease called trichomoniasis. It is the most common pathogenic protozoan that infects humans in industrialized countries. Infection rates in men and women are similar but women are usually symptomatic, while infections in men are usually asymptomatic. Transmission usually occurs via direct, skin-to-skin contact with an infected individual, most often through vaginal intercourse. The WHO has estimated that 160 million cases of infection are acquired annually worldwide. The estimates for North America alone are between 5 and 8 million new infections each year, with an estimated rate of asymptomatic cases as high as 50%. Usually treatment consists of metronidazole and tinidazole.

Clinical

History
Alfred Francois Donné (1801–1878) was the first to describe a procedure to diagnose trichomoniasis through "the microscopic observation of motile protozoa in vaginal or cervical secretions" in 1836. He published this in the article entitled, "Animalcules observés dans les matières purulentes et le produit des sécrétions des organes génitaux de l'homme et de la femme" in the journal, Comptes rendus de l'Académie des sciences. With it, he created the binomial name of the parasite as Trichomonas vaginalis.

Mechanism of infection

Trichomonas vaginalis, a parasitic protozoan, is the etiologic agent of trichomoniasis, and is a sexually transmitted infection. More than 160 million people worldwide are annually infected by this protozoan.

Symptoms
 Trichomoniasis, a sexually transmitted infection of the urogenital tract, is a common cause of vaginitis in women, while men with this infection can display symptoms of urethritis as well as symptoms of prostate infection. 'Frothy', greenish vaginal discharge with a 'musty' malodorous smell is characteristic.

Signs
Only 2% of women with the infection will have a "strawberry" cervix (colpitis macularis, an erythematous cervix with pinpoint areas of exudation) or vagina on examination. This is due to capillary hemorrhage.

Complications
Some of the complications of T. vaginalis in women include: preterm delivery, low birth weight, and increased mortality as well as predisposing to HIV infection, AIDS, and cervical cancer. T. vaginalis has also been reported in the urinary tract, fallopian tubes, and pelvis and can cause pneumonia, bronchitis, and oral lesions. Condoms are effective at reducing, but not wholly preventing, transmission.

Trichomonas vaginalis infection in males has been found to cause asymptomatic urethritis and prostatitis. It has been proposed that it may increase the risk of prostate cancer; however, evidence is insufficient to support this association as of 2014.

Diagnosis

Classically, with a cervical smear, infected women may have a transparent "halo" around their superficial cell nucleus but more typically the organism itself is seen with a slight cyanophilic tinge, faint eccentric nuclei, and fine acidophilic granules. It is unreliably detected by studying a genital discharge or with a cervical smear because of their low sensitivity. T. vaginalis is also routinely diagnosed via a wet mount, in which "corkscrew" motility is observed. Currently, the most common method of diagnosis is via overnight culture, with a sensitivity range of 75–95%. Newer methods, such as rapid antigen testing and transcription-mediated amplification, have even greater sensitivity, but are not in widespread use. The presence of T. vaginalis can also be diagnosed by PCR, using primers specific for GENBANK/L23861.

Treatment
Infection is treated and cured with metronidazole or tinidazole. The CDC recommends a one time dose of 2 grams of either metronidazole or tinidazole as the first-line treatment; the alternative treatment recommended is 500 milligrams of metronidazole, twice daily, for seven days if there is failure of the single-dose regimen. Medication should be prescribed to any sexual partner(s) as well because they may be asymptomatic carriers.

Morphology

Unlike other parasitic protozoa (Giardia lamblia, Entamoeba histolytica, etc.), Trichomonas vaginalis exists in only one morphological stage, a trophozoite, and cannot encyst. The T. vaginalis trophozoite is oval as well as flagellated, or "pear" shaped as seen on a wet-mount. It is slightly larger than a white blood cell, measuring 9 × 7 μm. Five flagella arise near the cytostome; four of these immediately extend outside the cell together, while the fifth flagellum wraps backwards along the surface of the organism. The functionality of the fifth flagellum is not known. In addition, a conspicuous barb-like axostyle projects opposite the four-flagella bundle. The axostyle may be used for attachment to surfaces and may also cause the tissue damage seen in trichomoniasis infections. The nucleus is usually elongated, and the cytoplasm contains many hydrogenosomes.

While T. vaginalis does not have a cyst form, organisms can survive for up to 24 hours in urine, semen, or even water samples. A nonmotile, round, pseudocystic form with internalized flagella has been observed under unfavorable conditions. This form is generally regarded as a degenerate stage as opposed to a resistant form, although viability of pseudocystic cells has been occasionally reported. The ability to revert to trophozoite form, to reproduce and sustain infection has been described, along with a microscopic cell staining technique to visually discern this elusive form.

Protein function
T. vaginalis lacks mitochondria and therefore necessary enzymes and cytochromes to conduct oxidative phosphorylation. It obtains nutrients by transport through the cell membrane and by phagocytosis. The organism is able to maintain energy requirements by the use of a small amount of enzymes to provide energy via glycolysis of glucose to glycerol and succinate in the cytoplasm, followed by further conversion of pyruvate and malate to hydrogen and acetate in an organelle called the hydrogenosome.

Virulence factors
One of the hallmark features of T. vaginalis is the adherence factors that allow cervicovaginal epithelium colonization in women. The adherence that this organism illustrates is specific to vaginal epithelial cells (VECs) being pH, time and temperature dependent. A variety of virulence factors mediate this process some of which are the microtubules, microfilaments, bacterial adhesins (4), and cysteine proteinases. The adhesins are four trichomonad enzymes called AP65, AP51, AP33, and AP23 that mediate the interaction of the parasite to the receptor molecules on VECs. Cysteine proteinases may be another virulence factor because not only do these 30 kDa proteins bind to host cell surfaces but also may degrade extracellular matrix proteins like hemoglobin, fibronectin or collagen IV.

Genome sequencing and statistics
The T. vaginalis genome is approximately 160 megabases in size – ten times larger than predicted from earlier gel-based chromosome sizing. (The human genome is ~3.5 gigabases by comparison.) As much as two-thirds of the T. vaginalis sequence consists of repetitive and transposable elements, reflecting a massive, evolutionarily recent expansion of the genome. The total number of predicted protein-coding genes is ~98,000, which includes ~38,000 'repeat' genes (virus-like, transposon-like, retrotransposon-like, and unclassified repeats, all with high copy number and low polymorphism). Approximately 26,000 of the protein-coding genes have been classed as 'evidence-supported' (similar either to known proteins, or to ESTs), while the remainder have no known function. These extraordinary genome statistics are likely to change downward as the genome sequence, currently very fragmented due to the difficulty of ordering repetitive DNA, is assembled into chromosomes, and as more transcription data (ESTs, microarrays) accumulate. But it appears that the gene number of the single-celled parasite T. vaginalis is, at minimum, on par with that of its host H. sapiens.

In late 2007 TrichDB.org was launched as a free, public genomic data repository and retrieval service devoted to genome-scale trichomonad data. The site currently contains all of the T. vaginalis sequence project data, several EST libraries, and tools for data mining and display. TrichDB is part of the NIH/NIAID-funded EupathDB functional genomics database project.

Genetic diversity 
Recent studies into the genetic diversity of T. vaginalis has shown that there are two distinct lineages of the parasite found worldwide; both lineages are represented evenly in field isolates. The two lineages differ in whether or not T. vaginalis virus (TVV) infection is present. TVV infection in T. vaginalis is clinically relevant in that, when present, TVV has an effect on parasite resistance to metronidazole, a first line drug treatment for human trichomoniasis.

Increased susceptibility to HIV
The damage caused by T. vaginalis to the vaginal epithelium increases a woman's susceptibility to an HIV infection. In addition to inflammation, the parasite also causes lysis of epithelial cells and RBCs in the area leading to more inflammation and disruption of the protective barrier usually provided by the epithelium. Having T. vaginalis also may increase the chances of the infected woman transmitting HIV to her sexual partner(s).

Evolution
The biology of T. vaginalis has implications for understanding the origin of sexual reproduction in eukaryotes. T. vaginalis is not known to undergo meiosis, a key stage of the eukaryotic sexual cycle.  However, when Malik et al. examined T. vaginalis for the presence of 29 genes known to function in meiosis, they found 27 such genes, including eight of nine genes that are specific to meiosis in model organisms.  These findings suggest that the capability for meiosis, and hence sexual reproduction, was present in recent ancestors of T. vaginalis.  21 of the 27 meiosis genes were also found in another parasite Giardia lamblia (also called Giardia intestinalis), indicating that these meiotic genes were present in a common ancestor of T. vaginalis and G. intestinalis.  Since these two species are descendants of lineages that are highly divergent among eukaryotes, and the meiotic genes were likely present in a common ancestor of all eukaryotes.

See also
 List of parasites (human)

References

Further reading

External links
 TIGR's Trichomonas vaginalis genome sequencing project.
 TrichDB: the Trichomonas vaginalis genome resource
 NIH site on trichomoniasis.
 Taxonomy
 eMedicine article on trichomoniasis.
 Patient UK

Metamonads
Sexually transmitted diseases and infections
Parasites of humans